Fernando Viola (born 14 March 1951 in Torrazza Piemonte; died 5 February 2001 in Rome in a road accident driving his scooter) was an Italian professional footballer who played as a midfielder.

Career
Viola began playing professional football with Juventus, where he would make his Serie A debut against Bologna on 12 March 1972.

References

1951 births
2001 deaths
Road incident deaths in Italy
Italian footballers
Serie A players
Serie B players
Juventus F.C. players
Mantova 1911 players
Cagliari Calcio players
S.S. Lazio players
Bologna F.C. 1909 players
Genoa C.F.C. players
Association football midfielders